The 1982–83 season was Chelsea Football Club's sixty-ninth competitive season. Struggling on and off the pitch, Chelsea narrowly escaped relegation to the Third Division and ultimately finished 18th, their lowest ever position in the Football League.

Table

References

External links
 1982–83 season at stamford-bridge.com

1982–83
English football clubs 1982–83 season